The Dean Case is a 1983 Australian TV movie which was the first of four telemovies called Verdict produced by the ABC dramatising real cases (the others being The Amorous Dentist, Who Killed Hannah Jane?, and The Schippan Mystery).

Plot
The movie tells the story of George Dean, a Sydney-based ferry boat master, arrested in 1895 for attempting to poison his wife.

Cast

Lewis Fitz-Gerald as George Dean
Paul Mason as Paddy Crick
Lola Brooks as Mrs. Seymour
Celia De Burgh as Mary Dean
Ivar Kants

References

External links
The Dean Case at Austlit
The Dean Case at IMDb
The Dean Case at Screen Australia

Australian television films
1982 television films
1982 films
Fiction set in 1895
Films directed by Kevin James Dobson
1980s Australian films